Jati Umra is a small village in the Tarn Taran district (formerly Amritsar district) of Punjab, India. Pakistan's well-known businessman Muhammad Sharif belonged to Jati Umrah. He left his everything in India and moved to Pakistan in 1947. the co-founder of Ittefaq Group and founder of Sharif Group. Two of his three sons, Nawaz and Shehbaz became Prime Ministers of Pakistan.

History
Jati Umra is notable for being the ancestral village of Sharif family of Pakistan, also including the former Prime Minister of Pakistan, Nawaz Sharif.
In December 2013, the Chief Minister of Punjab, Shehbaz Sharif during India visit also went to the grave of his great-grandfather Mian Mohammad Baksh at the village and offered a holy sheet. Mian Muhammad Sharif, the former head of Sharif family, had lived in Indian Jati Umra before migrating to Lahore in 1947.

References

Villages in Tarn Taran district
Sharif family